

A 

Acqua Lokos (Capao da Canoa, Rio Grande do Sul, Brazil)
Adlabs Imagica (Mumbai, Maharashtra, India)
Admiral Vrungel (Gelendjik, Krasnodar, Russia)
Adventure Asia Park (Sentosa, Singapore)
Adventure City (Anaheim, California, United States)
Adventure Island (amusement park) (Southend on Sea, Essex, England)
Adventure Island (water park) (Tampa, Florida, United States)
Adventuredome (Las Vegas, Nevada, United States)
Adventureland (Addison, Illinois, United States)
Adventureland (Altoona, Iowa, United States)
Adventureland (Farmingdale, New York, United States)
Adventureland (Sharjah, United Arab Emirates)
Adventureland Amusement Park (North Webster, Indiana, United States)
Adventure Landing (Jacksonville Beach, Florida, United States)
Adventure World (Bibra Lake, Western Australia)
Adventure World (Shirahama, Nishimuro, Japan)
Aérocity Parc (Aubenas, Rhône-Alpes, France)
Affen- und Vogelpark (Reichshof Eckenhagen, North Rhine-Westphalia, Germany)
Ajwa Fun World & Resort (Baroda, Gujarat, India)
Ak Botah (Almaty, Almaty, Kazakhstan)
Al-Hamrah Entertainment Village (Riyadh, Saudi Arabia)
Al Hokair Land Theme Park (Riyadh, Saudi Arabia)
Al Mogran Amusement Park (Khartoum, Sudan)
Al Nasr Leisureland (Dubai, United Arab Emirates)
Al-Rawdah Sharaco Amusement Park (Riyadh, Saudi Arabia)
Al-Sawary Mall (Jeddah, Makkah, Saudi Arabia)
Al-Sha'ab Leisure Park (Salmiya, Kuwait)
Al-Shallal Theme Park (Jeddah, Makkah, Saudi Arabia)
Alabama Adventure (Bessemer, Alabama, United States)
Alabama State Fairgrounds (Birmingham, Alabama, United States)
Aladdin's Kingdom (Doha, Qatar)
Alice in Wonderland (Christchurch, Dorset, England)
All Star Adventures (Wichita, Kansas, United States)
Allou Fun Park (Athens, Attica, Greece)
Alton Towers (Alton, Staffordshire, England)
Amanohashidate View Lands (Miyazu, Kyoto, Japan)
The American Adventure Theme Park (Ilkeston, Derbyshire, England)
American Adventures (Marietta, Georgia, United States)
Amsterdam Dungeon (Amsterdam, North Holland, Netherlands)
Amusement Land (Busan, South Korea)
Amusementspark Tivoli (Berg en Dal, Gelderland, Netherlands)
Animax (Lisbon, Portugal)
Antics Land (Sharjah, United Arab Emirates)
Appu Ghar (New Delhi, India)
Aqtau Park (Aqtau, Mangystau Province, Kazakhstan)
Aqua Stadium (Takanawa, Minato, Japan)
Aquarena Springs (San Marcos, Texas, United States)
Aquashow Fun Family Park (Quarteira, Algarve, Portugal)
Aquatica (Orlando, Florida, United States)
Aquatica (San Antonio, Texas, United States)
Arakawa Park (Arakawa, Tokyo, Japan)
Argenpark (Lujan, Buenos Aires, Argentina)
Arnolds Park (Arnolds Park, Iowa, United States)
Asahiyama Zoo (Asahikawa, Hokkaidō, Japan)
Astroland (Brooklyn, New York, United States)
Atami Korakuen Yuenchi Apio (Atami, Shizuoka, Japan)
Attica Amusements - Athens, Greece
Attractionmania - Moscow, Russia
Aussie World (Sunshine Coast, Queensland, Australia)
Australia Zoo (Sunshine Coast, Queensland, Australia)
Aventura Center (Buenos Aires, Argentina)
Aventura Selvagem (Penha, Santa Catarina, Brazil)
Avonturenpark Hellendoorn (Hellendoorn, Overijssel, Netherlands)
Aziza Mall (Riyadh, Saudi Arabia)

B 
Bagatelle (Merlimont, Nord-Pas de Calais, France)
Baishinji Park (Matsuyama, Ehime, Japan)
Baja Amusements (Ocean City, Maryland, United States)
Bakken (Klampenborg, Sjaelland, Denmark)
Bandung Super Mall (Bandung, Jawa Barat, Indonesia)
Barry Island Pleasure Park (Barry Island, Glamorgan, Wales)
Barry's Amusements (Portrush, County Antrim, Northern Ireland)
Bay Beach Amusement Park (Green Bay, Wisconsin, United States)
Bayern Park (Reisbach, Bavaria, Germany)
Bayville Amusements (Bayville, New York, United States)
Beech Bend (Bowling Green, Kentucky, United States)
Beekse Bergen (Hilvarenbeek, North Brabant, Netherlands)
Beijing Amusement Park (Beijing, China)
Beijing Shijingshan Amusement Park (Beijing, China)
Belantis (Leipzig, Saxony, Germany)
Bellewaerde Park (Ypres, West Flanders, Belgium)
Bell's Amusement Park (Tulsa, Oklahoma, United States)
Belmont Park (San Diego, California, United States)
Benyland (Sendai, Miyagi, Japan)
Beoland (Nizhny Novgorod, Nizhni Novgorod, Russia)
Beto Carrero World (Penha, Santa Catarina, Brazil)
Big Shot Amusement Park (Linn Creek, Missouri, United States)
Billing Aquadrome (Northampton, Northamptonshire, England)
Biwako Tower (Otsu, Shiga, Japan)
Blackbeard's Cave (Bayville, New Jersey, United States)
Blackbeard's Family Entertainment Center (Fresno, California, United States)
Blackgang Chine (Ventnor, Isle of Wight, England)
Blackpool Pleasure Beach (Blackpool, Lancashire, England)
Blue Diamond Park (New Castle, Delaware, United States)
Boardwalk and Baseball (Haines City, Florida, United States)
Boardwalk Fun Park (Grand Prairie, Texas, United States)
Bobbejaanland (Lichtaart, Antwerp, Belgium)
BonBon-Land (Holme-Olstrup, Sjaelland, Denmark)
Boomers! (Dania, Florida, United States)
Boomers! (Fountain Valley, California, United States)
Boomers! (Medford, New York, United States)
Boomers! (Upland, California, United States)
Boomerang Bay (Santa Clara, California, United States)
Bosque Mágico (Guadalupe, Nuevo León, Mexico)
Botton's Pleasure Beach (Skegness, Lincolnshire, England)
Boudewijn Seapark (Bruges, West Flanders, Belgium)
Bowcraft Amusement Park (Scotch Plains, New Jersey, United States)
Boyd Park (Wabash, Indiana, United States)
Bracalandia (Braga, Braga, Portugal)
Branson USA (Branson, Missouri, United States)
Brean Leisure Park (Brean, Somerset, England)
Bridlington Experience (Bridlington, East Riding of Yorkshire, England)
Brighton Pier (Brighton, East Sussex, England)
Burlington Amusement Park (Kensington, Prince Edward Island, Canada)
Busch Gardens Tampa Bay (Tampa, Florida, United States)
Busch Gardens Williamsburg (Williamsburg, Virginia, United States)
Bushkill Park (Easton, Pennsylvania, United States)

A

nl:Lijst van attractieparken (A-B)
ru:Парки развлечений по алфавиту
sv:Lista över nöjesparker (A-D)